Santipur Muslim High School is a Government Sponsored Institution located in Santipur, Nadia district, West Bengal, India. This Institution was affiliated in the year 1938. This is a reputed and premium educational institution of Santipur municipal area. It is a boys' school and it has Upper Primary with Secondary and Higher Secondary section (class V to class XII).

History
Santipur Muslim High School was formerly known as Santipur Jubilee Madrassah. J. Andrew Taylor, Assistant Director of Public Instruction for Mahon Medan Education visited Santipur Jubilee Madrassah on 15th day of April, 1914.

The school was started with 35 students in 1887 initially. Muhammad Helaluddin, a retired Govt. employee established this Institution.

On 2 January 1937, class VII class VIII was started. In the year 1938, the school got affiliation from University of Calcutta to start class IX and class X. Sir Muhammad Azizul Haque's initiative made this possible. This school is presently affiliated to West Bengal Board of Secondary Education (WBBSE) and West Bengal Council of Higher Secondary Education (WBCHSE).

See also
Education in India
List of schools in India
Education in West Bengal

References

External links

Boys' schools in India
High schools and secondary schools in West Bengal
Schools in Nadia district
1887 establishments in India
Educational institutions established in 1887